Mandamai Forest Reserve is a protected forest reserve in Pitas District of Kudat Division in Sabah, Malaysia. It was designated as a Class 1 Protection Forest by the Sabah Forestry Department in 1984. Two forest types make up the reserve: dipterocarp and kerangas. The main threat to the reserve forests is from fires.

Flora
The most common species in Mandamai Forest Reserve are the tree species Dryobalanops beccarii and Shorea falciferoides. The reserve also hosts threatened tree species such as Shorea laevis, Dipterocarpus caudiferus and Dipterocarpus confertus. Other species include  Barringtonia sarcostachys,  Carallia borneensis,  Castanopsis motleyana,  Irvingia malayana,  Lithocarpus gracilis,  Mangifera pajang and Octomeles sumatrana.

Fauna
Mandamai Forest Reserve is home to animals including barking deer and wild boar. Tracks of clouded leopard and sun bear have been observed.

References

Forest reserves of Sabah
Borneo lowland rain forests